Events in the year 1614 in Norway.

Incumbents
Monarch: Christian IV

Events
 8 December - Jens Bjelke became Chancellor of Norway.

Arts and literature

Births

Deaths
15 October - Peder Claussøn Friis, author (born 1545)